Oddvar Torsheim (born 2 November 1938) is a Norwegian painter, illustrator and musician.

Torsheim was born in Bergen to teachers Herman Johan Torsheim and Jenny Pauline Høvik. Among his publications are Syner i syttiåra from 1980, and Svarte kvitingar i 80-åra from 1988. His book illustrations include Cindy Haug's children's book Her der – helt nær  from 1983 and Ingvar Moe's essay collection Frå oppvaskkummen, and he recorded the music albums Nynorskens skog in 1992 and Tur-retur Blues in 2000. He is represented with artworks in the Norwegian Museum of Contemporary Art  in Oslo.

References

1938 births
Living people
Artists from Bergen
Norwegian illustrators
Musicians from Bergen
20th-century Norwegian painters
Norwegian male painters
21st-century Norwegian painters
20th-century Norwegian male artists
21st-century Norwegian male artists